Presidential elections were held in Macedonia on 31 October 1999, with a second round on 14 November. Tito Petkovski of the Social Democratic Union won the first round. However, as he received less than 50% of the vote, the election went to a second round, which was won by Boris Trajkovski of VMRO-DPMNE, who won 53.2% of the vote.

Results

References

External links
State Electoral Commission, Presidential elections 1999

Macedonia
1999 in the Republic of Macedonia
Presidential elections in North Macedonia
October 1999 events in Europe
November 1999 events in Europe